Jassem Khalloufi  (born 2 September 1981) is a Tunisian footballer. He currently plays for Stade Tunisien.

Khalloufi was part of the Tunisian 2004 Olympic football team who exited in the first round, finishing third in Group C, behind group and gold medal winners Argentina and runners-up Australia.

References

1981 births
Living people
Tunisian footballers
Footballers at the 2004 Summer Olympics
Olympic footballers of Tunisia
Association football goalkeepers
EO Goulette et Kram players
AS Marsa players
CS Sfaxien players
Étoile Sportive du Sahel players
Stade Tunisien players